The Battle of Fontenoy, 11 May 1745, was a major engagement of the War of the Austrian Succession, fought between the forces of the Pragmatic Army – comprising mainly Dutch, British, and Hanoverian troops, as well a relatively small contingent of Austrians under the command of the Duke of Cumberland – and a French army under the titular command of King Louis XV of France, with actual field command held by  Maurice de Saxe, commander of Louis XV's forces in the Low Countries.

When the two armies met on the field they were approximately equal in numbers. Although there is not complete agreement among historians on the exact numbers, there is general agreement that there were about 50,000 men on each side with the French having more cavalry and the allies having more infantry. Some historians put the French as more numerous while others make the allies more numerous.

Complete agreement on the order of battle, sizes of the armies, precise returns on casualties is not possible as official returns are few and made by different countries with differing criteria and not all are made at the same time so that variations and disagreements will occur even in those returns of the same army. For example, Skrine points out his book in Fontenoy and Great Britain's share in the war of the Austrian Succession that most of the British troops that were listed as missing, in initial returns,  turned out to have been killed or wounded. There are detailed, contemporary, official returns in various forms available for most troops in both armies except for the French cavalry for which there are some lists of officer casualties but the returns for the rank and file were apparently not made and the estimate generally accepted for their losses is the one made by Voltaire shortly after the battle. Wherever possible, names of units and numbers of casualties are given without any attempt to reconcile or synthesize the various sources.

Order of Battle for the Army of Louis XV of France at Fontenoy 1745

Historians give various estimates for the French army. With a general lack of primary source information just before the battle on the exact number of soldiers involved, the estimates rely on a better understanding of the numbers of battalions and squadrons present at the battle and multiply  the total of battalions and squadrons by an average for each. Skrine arrives at his estimate by multiplying  the number of battalions by 690 soldiers and the number of squadrons by 160 troopers. This approach can be flawed. Lucien Moulliard in The French Army of Louis XV states that the regulation strength, or paper strength, of a battalion is 685 men and that of a squadron is 150 to 160. Actual field strength is lower than regulation strength due to various forms of attrition such as illness, straggling, desertion death, wounds or capture in battle prior to the battle in question.

French Army

Order of Battle for the Army of the Pragmatic Allies of Britain, Hanover, the Dutch Republic and Austria at Fontenoy 1745

The British army foot and cavalry regiments had a peacetime establishment, a wartime establishment, an effective strength and a field strength. Peacetime establishment was a much reduced strength that was increased during the war by Parliament. However, the wartime establishment was frequently unmet as there was always some variable number of purposely unfilled rank and file to provide the regiment with some flexible funding. The effective strength, therefore, was actual number of rank and file that was initially sent on campaign. The effective strength would immediately begin to vary as the campaign progressed due to sickness, wounds or death in battle, desertion, new reinforcement drafts, etc. and the resultant strengths at any given time are the field strengths. British foot regiments generally consisted of a single battalion made up of a variable number of companies, usually 9 or 10. Some foot regiments, such as the Guards, had more than one battalion but the battalions of a regiment rarely served together in the field. Cavalry regiments consisted of 1 to 4 squadrons.

The Historical memoirs of His late Royal Highness William-Augustus, duke of Cumberland explains in a foot note that, according to a return in 1749, for the 1st Foot Guards wartime establishment strength voted by Parliament was 3,080 while the effective strength was 2,689, the 2nd Foot Guards was 1,980 establishment and effective 1,842, the 3rd Foot Guards 1,980; effective 1,630. There were 3 battalions in the 1st Foot  Guards, 2 of 9 companies and one of 10. As can be seen from the above, the average establishment strength of a battalion of the 1st Guards is slightly over 1,000 while the effective strength is about 895 and the 2nd is 990 and 921 while the 3rd is 895 and 815. For the entire army of 43,676 men voted by Parliament the effective strength was 38,200 in 1749.

As for other armies, historians often determine the army's strength based on an average strength for the battalion or squadron. In 1745 Parliament voted 28,107 men in Flanders consisting of: 2 troops of Horse Guards, 1 of Horse Grenadier Guards, 3 regiments of horse, six of dragoons; 21 regiments (battalions) of foot, 3 battalions of Foot Guards. This force, less four regiments of foot and one regiment of dragoons, is the British contingent at Fontenoy. Rolt gives an estimated strength for this force at Fontenoy as 21,000 consisting of 20 battalions  of foot and  26 squadrons of horse. Colin is in close agreement with this estimate with a further breakdown of the total with 16,170 foot in 20 battalions and 4,656 horse in 26 squadrons, giving an average battalion strength of 808 men and an average squadron strength of 179. Skrine, who gives impossibly high field strengths for French foot battalions, uses remarkably low average field strengths for British battalions and squadrons: 650 per battalion and 150 per squadron by which he arrives at his total for the British contingent of 16,900 (13,000 foot and 3,900 horse).

British contingent

Hanoverian contingent

Austrian contingent

Dutch contingent

Footnotes

Bibliography 
 Black, Jeremy (1998). Britain as a Military Power, 1688–1815. Routledge. .
 Boyle P. The Irish Brigade at Fontenoy from The Irish Ecclesiastical Record, Vol. XVII, 1905, Dublin.
 Broglie, Albert le Duc de. La Journée De Fontenoy, Paris, 1891.
 Chandler, David G. The Art of Warfare in the Age of Marlborough. Spellmount Limited. 1990. .
 Colin, Jean Lambert Alphonse. Les Campagnes du Maréchal de Saxe, 3 volumes. Paris: R. Chapelot, 1901–06, Volumes 1-3: Volume 3 Fontenoy is divided into 2 parts: Colin's narrative of the battle and the some 500 pages of the Piéces Justificatives which are contemporary accounts of the battle, records, returns, letters, etc.. Both parts have their own pagination. Much of this is available in the Revue d'histoire rédigée à l'État-major de l'armée, Section historique, 1905/01 (A7,VOL17,N49)-1905/03 (A7,VOL17,N51). Online: 
 d' Espagnac, Jean-Baptiste-Joseph Damarzit de Sahuguet. Histoire de Maurice, comte de Saxe, duc de Courlande et de Semigalle, Volume 2, Paris, MDCCLXXV.
 Duncan, Francis. History of the Royal Regiment of Artillery, London, 1879, Vol.1.
 Fortescue, J. W. A History of the British Army, Macmillan, London, 1899, Vol. II.
 Hamilton, Lieutenant-General F.W..Origin and History of the First or Grenadier Guards, London, 1874, Vol. II.
 Mackinnon, Daniel. Origin and services of the Coldstream Guards, London 1883, Vol.I.
 O'Callaghan, John Cornelius. History of the Irish Brigades in the Service of France, London, 1870.
 Pajol, Charles Pierre Victor. Les Guerres sous Louis XV''', Tome III, Adamant Media Corp. 2006, .
 Pichat, Henry. La Campagne du Maréchal de Saxe dans les Flandres, Paris, 1909.
 Rolt, Richard. Historical memoirs of His late Royal Highness William-Augustus, duke of Cumberland, London, 1768.
 Skrine, Francis Henry. Fontenoy and Great Britain's Share in the War of the Austrian Succession 1741–48. London, 1906.
 Townshend, Sir Charles Vere Ferrers. The military life of Field-Marshal George first marquess Townshend, London, 1901.
 Weigley, Russell F (1991). The Age of Battles: The Quest for Decisive Warfare from Breitenfeld to Waterloo. Indiana University Press. .
 White, Jon Manchip. Marshal of France, The Life and Times of Maurice de Saxe, Rand McNally & Co., 1962.
 Geerdink-Schaftenaar, Marc. For Orange and the States. The Army of the Dutch Republic, 1713-1772. Part I: Infantry, Helion and Company, 2018. 

 Further reading
 Gailly de Taurines, Charles. Fontenoy (11 Mai 1745), Liste Par Régiment Des Officiers Tués ou Blessés tirée des archives de la guerre.'', A. Picard et fils, 1904.

Orders of battle
Battles involving Austria
Battles involving France
Battles involving Great Britain
Battles involving Hanover
Battles involving the Dutch Republic
Battles of the War of the Austrian Succession
Conflicts in 1745
1745 in France